Andrew Grant (born 22 April 1985) is an Australian volleyball player. He is competed for Australia at the 2012 Summer Olympics. After the 2012 Summer Olympics he returned to Australia and married longtime girlfriend Nancy Owens.

References

Australian men's volleyball players
Volleyball players at the 2012 Summer Olympics
Olympic volleyball players of Australia
1985 births
Living people